Fleischner is a German-language surname literally meaning butcher. Notable people with the surname include:

Felix Fleischner 
Herbert Fleischner
Karel Fleischner
Richard Fleischner 
Sam Fleischner

See also

Occupational surnames
German-language surnames